Ranella is a genus of large warm-water and tropical sea snails, marine gastropod molluscs in the family Ranellidae, the tritons.

Shell description
The shells of species within this genus are very large and solid, with a tall spire, a rounded aperture, a broadly flanged outer lip, and a moderately long siphonal canal, which is flexed and inclined to the left.  The varices are prominent and rounded, but are hollowed out on the inside.

Species
Species within the genus Ranella include:
 Ranella australasia (Perry, 1811)
 † Ranella bellardii (Weinkauff, 1868) 
 Ranella gemmifera (Euthyme, 1889)
 †Ranella kaiparaensis (Finlay, 1924) 
 Ranella olearium Linnaeus, 1758
Synonyms
Ranella reticularis (Linnaeus, 1758) sensu Deshayes, 1839: synonym of Ranella olearium (Linnaeus, 1758)

References

 Lamarck J.B. (1816). Liste des objets représentés dans les planches de cette livraison. In: Tableau encyclopédique et méthodique des trois règnes de la Nature. Mollusques et Polypes divers. Agasse, Paris. 16 pp.
 Schumacher, C.F. 1817. Essai d'un Nouveau Systéme des Habitations des vers Testacés. Copenhagen : Schultz 287 pp., pls 1-22.
 Dall, W.H. 1904. A historical and systematic review of the frog-shells and tritons. Smithsonian Miscellaneous Collections 47: 114-144
 Iredale, T. 1917. More molluscan name-changes, generic and specific. Proceedings of the Malacological Society of London 12(6): 322-330
 Rolán E., 2005. Malacological Fauna From The Cape Verde Archipelago. Part 1, Polyplacophora and Gastropoda.
 Vaught, K.C.; Tucker Abbott, R.; Boss, K.J. (1989). A classification of the living Mollusca. American Malacologists: Melbourne. ISBN 0-915826-22-4. XII, 195 pp.

Further reading
 R. Tucker Abbott & S. Peter Dance, 1982, Compendium of Seashells, Duttin, New York

External links
 Schumacher, C. F. (1817). Essai d'un nouveau système des habitations des vers testacés. Schultz, Copenghagen. iv + 288 pp., 22 pls.
 Iredale, T. (1917). Molluscan name-changes, generic and specific. Proceedings of the Malacological Society of London. 12(6): 322-330
 Dall W.H. (1925). Illustrations of unfigured types of shells in the collections of the United States National Museum. Proceedings of the United States National Museum. 66, art. 17, no. 2554: 1-41, pls. 1-36
 Gofas, S.; Le Renard, J.; Bouchet, P. (2001). Mollusca. in: Costello, M.J. et al. (eds), European Register of Marine Species: a check-list of the marine species in Europe and a bibliography of guides to their identification. Patrimoines Naturels. 50: 180-213
 Ranella at Malacolog

Ranellidae
Gastropod genera
Taxa named by Jean-Baptiste Lamarck
Taxonomy articles created by Polbot